Mesquer is a commune in the Loire-Atlantique department in western France.

Population

References

See also
La Baule - Guérande Peninsula
Communes of the Loire-Atlantique department
The works of Jean Fréour Sculptor with works in Mesquer

Communes of Loire-Atlantique